Philippine swamphen (Porphyrio pulverulentus Temminck, 1826) is a species of swamphen occurring in The Philippines. It used to be considered a subspecies of the purple swamphen, which it resembles, but has olive-chestnut mantle and scapulars, and the whole plumage is tinged with ash-grey.

References 

Philippine swamphen
Endemic birds of the Philippines
Wading birds
Philippine swamphen